Andrei Vyacheslavovich Churin (born 2 August 1995) is a Russian football player.

Club career
He made his professional debut in the Russian Football National League for FC Volga Nizhny Novgorod on 10 August 2014 in a game against FC Volgar Astrakhan.

References

External links
 
 
 Career summary by sportbox.ru

1995 births
Place of birth missing (living people)
Living people
Russian footballers
Association football midfielders
FC Volga Nizhny Novgorod players